Count James Daniel Bruce (tr. ; 11 May 1669 – 30 April 1735) was a Russian general, statesman, diplomat and scientist of Scottish descent (Clan Bruce), one of the chief associates of Peter the Great. According to his own record, his ancestors had lived in Russia since 1647. He was the younger brother of Robert Bruce, the first High Commandant of Saint Petersburg.

He participated in the Crimean (1687, 1689) and Azov campaigns (1695–1696) of Peter the Great against the Ottoman Empire during the Russo-Turkish War. During the Great Northern War Bruce was appointed major-general of artillery. He was involved in the revival of Russian artillery, which had been lost to the Swedish forces along with its commander, Prince Alexander of Imereti at Narva in 1700.  He was commander of artillery in the Battle of Poltava (1709), for which he was made a knight of the Order of St Andrew.   In 1721, he became one of the first Russian counts.

Bruce was one of the best educated people in Russia at the time, a naturalist and astronomer. In 1701 he founded the first Russian observatory; it was located in Moscow in the upper story of the Sukharev Tower. Bruce's scientific library of more than 1,500 volumes became a substantial part of the Russian Academy of Sciences library.

Among Muscovites, Bruce gained fame as an alchemist and magician, due in part to the innovative design of the Sukharev Tower, which was very unusual in 18th century Moscow. It was rumored that the greatest Black Magic grimoires of his collection had been bricked up into the walls of the Sukharev Tower.

Honours
 : Order of the White Eagle

References

External links
Photograph of a page of the Calendar of Bruce, 1710 (etching) from the State Hermitage Museum in St. Petersburg
About the Jacob Bruce book collection at the Russian Academy of Sciences Library, St. Petersburg

1669 births
1735 deaths
Field marshals of Russia
Astronomers from the Russian Empire
Counts of the Russian Empire
Russian people of Scottish descent
17th-century alchemists
18th-century alchemists
Jacob Bruce
Russian military personnel of the Great Northern War
Battle of Poltava
Recipients of the Order of the White Eagle (Poland)